Amylocaine was the first synthetic local anesthetic. It was synthesized and patented under the name Stovaine by Ernest Fourneau at the Pasteur Institute in 1903. It was used mostly in spinal anesthesia.

Synthesis

Grignard reaction of chloroacetone (1) with one mole of magnesium ethyl bromide gives 1-chloro-2-methyl-butan-2-ol [74283-48-0] (2). Heating with dimethylamine gives 1-(dimethylamino)-2-methylbutan-2-ol [74347-10-7] (3). These two steps can also be treated as interchangeable. Esterification with benzoyl chloride completed the synthesis of amylocaine (4).

See also
 Dimethylaminopivalophenone, an opioid with a similar structure–activity relationship (SAR). It is an amine that is a sole methylene spacer shorter.

Notes and references

External links
 
 

Local anesthetics
Benzoate esters
Dimethylamino compounds